Nizar Khanfir is a Tunisian football manager.

Managing CS Hammam-Lif, he went on to work for the national federation as manager of Tunisia U23 and Tunisia Olympic. In December 2015 he was hired as manager of Tunisian Ligue Professionnelle 1 club Stade Gabèsien. On 19 February 2016, a crowd of displeased Stade Gabèsien fans gathered at the training ground and interrupted the session. Khanfir subsequently left the club. He instead joined Rwandan club APR F.C. ahead of their 2016 CAF Champions League qualifying game against Yanga. Following a longer stint at Qatari team Al-Sailiya SC, he was hired as director of sports at CS Sfaxien in March 2021.

References

Year of birth missing (living people)
Living people
Tunisian football managers
CS Hammam-Lif managers
Stade Gabèsien managers
APR F.C. managers
Tunisian Ligue Professionnelle 1 managers
Tunisian expatriate football managers
Expatriate football managers in Rwanda
Tunisian expatriate sportspeople in Qatar